Jet streams are fast flowing, narrow, meandering air currents in the atmospheres of some planets, including Earth. On Earth, the main jet streams are located near the altitude of the tropopause and are westerly winds (flowing west to east). Jet streams may start, stop, split into two or more parts, combine into one stream, or flow in various directions including opposite to the direction of the remainder of the jet.

Overview
The Northern Hemisphere and the Southern Hemisphere each have a polar jet and a subtropical jet. The northern hemisphere polar jet flows over the middle to northern latitudes of North America, Europe, and Asia and their intervening oceans, while the southern hemisphere polar jet mostly circles Antarctica, both all year round.

Jet streams are the product of two factors: the atmospheric heating by solar radiation that produces the large-scale polar, Ferrel, and Hadley circulation cells, and the action of the Coriolis force acting on those moving masses. The Coriolis force is caused by the planet's rotation on its axis. On other planets, internal heat rather than solar heating drives their jet streams. The polar jet stream forms near the interface of the polar and Ferrel circulation cells; the subtropical jet forms near the boundary of the Ferrel and Hadley circulation cells.

Other jet streams also exist. During the Northern Hemisphere summer, easterly jets can form in tropical regions, typically where dry air encounters more humid air at high altitudes. Low-level jets also are typical of various regions such as the central United States.  There are also jet streams in the thermosphere.

Meteorologists use the location of some of the jet streams as an aid in weather forecasting. The main commercial relevance of the jet streams is in air travel, as flight time can be dramatically affected by either flying with the flow or against. Often, airlines work to fly 'with' the jet stream to obtain significant fuel cost and time savings. Dynamic North Atlantic Tracks are one example of how airlines and air traffic control work together to accommodate the jet stream and winds aloft that results in the maximum benefit for airlines and other users. Clear-air turbulence, a potential hazard to aircraft passenger safety, is often found in a jet stream's vicinity, but it does not create a substantial alteration of flight times.

Discovery
The first indications of this phenomenon came from American professor Elias Loomis in the 1800s, when he proposed a powerful air current in the upper air blowing west to east across the United States as an explanation for the behaviour of major storms. After the 1883 eruption of the Krakatoa volcano, weather watchers tracked and mapped the effects on the sky over several years. They labelled the phenomenon the "equatorial smoke stream". In the 1920s, a Japanese meteorologist, Wasaburo Oishi, detected the jet stream from a site near Mount Fuji. He tracked pilot balloons, also known as pibals (balloons used to determine upper level winds), as they rose into the atmosphere. Oishi's work largely went unnoticed outside Japan because it was published in Esperanto. American pilot Wiley Post, the first man to fly around the world solo in 1933, is often given some credit for discovery of jet streams. Post invented a pressurized suit that let him fly above . In the year before his death, Post made several attempts at a high-altitude transcontinental flight, and noticed that at times his ground speed greatly exceeded his air speed.
German meteorologist Heinrich Seilkopf is credited with coining a special term, Strahlströmung (literally "jet current"), for the phenomenon in 1939. Many sources credit real understanding of the nature of jet streams to regular and repeated flight-path traversals during World War II. Similarly in 1944 a team of American meteorologists in Guam, including Reid Bryson, had enough observations to forecast very high west winds that would slow World War II bombers travelling to Japan.

Description

Jet streams wander laterally dramatically, and change in altitude. The jet streams form near breaks in the tropopause, at the transitions between the polar, Ferrel and Hadley circulation cells, and whose circulation, with the Coriolis force acting on those masses, drives the jet streams. The polar jets, at lower altitude, and often intruding into mid-latitudes, strongly affect weather and aviation. The polar jet stream is most commonly found between latitudes 30° and 60° (closer to 60°), while the subtropical jet streams are located close to latitude 30°. These two jets merge at some locations and times, while at other times they are well separated. The northern polar jet stream is said to "follow the sun" as it slowly migrates northward as that hemisphere warms, and southward again as it cools.

Jet streams are typically continuous over long distances, but discontinuities are also common. The path of the jet typically has a meandering shape, and these meanders themselves propagate eastward, at lower speeds than that of the actual wind within the flow. Each large meander, or wave, within the jet stream is known as a Rossby wave (planetary wave). Rossby waves are caused by changes in the Coriolis effect with latitude. Jet streams can split into two when they encounter an upper-level low, that diverts a portion of the jet stream under its base, while the remainder of the jet moves by to its north.

The wind speeds are greatest where temperature differences between air masses are greatest, and often exceed . Speeds of  have been measured.

The jet stream moves from West to East bringing changes of weather. Meteorologists now understand that the path of jet streams affects cyclonic storm systems at lower levels in the atmosphere, and so knowledge of their course has become an important part of weather forecasting. For example, in 2007 and 2012, Britain experienced severe flooding as a result of the polar jet staying south for the summer.

Cause

In general, winds are strongest immediately under the tropopause (except locally, during tornadoes, tropical cyclones or other anomalous situations). If two air masses of different temperatures or densities meet, the resulting pressure difference caused by the density difference (which ultimately causes wind) is highest within the transition zone. The wind does not flow directly from the hot to the cold area, but is deflected by the Coriolis effect and flows along the boundary of the two air masses.

All these facts are consequences of the thermal wind relation. The balance of forces acting on an atmospheric air parcel in the vertical direction is primarily between the gravitational force acting on the mass of the parcel and the buoyancy force, or the difference in pressure between the top and bottom surfaces of the parcel. Any imbalance between these forces results in the acceleration of the parcel in the imbalance direction: upward if the buoyant force exceeds the weight, and downward if the weight exceeds the buoyancy force. The balance in the vertical direction is referred to as hydrostatic. Beyond the tropics, the dominant forces act in the horizontal direction, and the primary struggle is between the Coriolis force and the pressure gradient force. Balance between these two forces is referred to as geostrophic. Given both hydrostatic and geostrophic balance, one can derive the thermal wind relation: the vertical gradient of the horizontal wind is proportional to the horizontal temperature gradient. If two air masses in the northern hemisphere, one cold and dense to the north and the other hot and less dense to the south, are separated by a vertical boundary and that boundary should be removed, the difference in densities will result in the cold air mass slipping under the hotter and less dense air mass. The Coriolis effect will then cause poleward-moving mass to deviate to the East, while equatorward-moving mass will deviate toward the west. The general trend in the atmosphere is for temperatures to decrease in the poleward direction. As a result, winds develop an eastward component and that component grows with altitude. Therefore, the strong eastward moving jet streams are in part a simple consequence of the fact that the Equator is warmer than the north and south poles.

Polar jet stream
The thermal wind relation does not explain why the winds are organized into tight jets, rather than distributed more broadly over the hemisphere. One factor that contributes to the creation of a concentrated polar jet is the undercutting of sub-tropical air masses by the more dense polar air masses at the polar front. This causes a sharp north-south pressure (south-north potential vorticity) gradient in the horizontal plane, an effect which is most significant during double Rossby wave breaking events. At high altitudes, lack of friction allows air to respond freely to the steep pressure gradient with low pressure at high altitude over the pole. This results in the formation of planetary wind circulations that experience a strong Coriolis deflection and thus can be considered 'quasi-geostrophic'. The polar front jet stream is closely linked to the frontogenesis process in midlatitudes, as the acceleration/deceleration of the air flow induces areas of low/high pressure respectively, which link to the formation of cyclones and anticyclones along the polar front in a relatively narrow region.

Subtropical jet
A second factor which contributes to a concentrated jet is more applicable to the subtropical jet which forms at the poleward limit of the tropical Hadley cell, and to first order this circulation is symmetric with respect to longitude. Tropical air rises to the tropopause, and moves poleward before sinking; this is the Hadley cell circulation. As it does so it tends to conserve angular momentum, since friction with the ground is slight. Air masses that begin moving poleward are deflected eastward by the Coriolis force (true for either hemisphere), which for poleward moving air implies an increased westerly component of the winds (note that deflection is leftward in the southern hemisphere).

Other planets
Jupiter's atmosphere has multiple jet streams, caused by the convection cells that form the familiar banded color structure; on Jupiter, these convection cells are driven by internal heating. The factors that control the number of jet streams in a planetary atmosphere is an active area of research in dynamical meteorology. In models, as one increases the planetary radius, holding all other parameters fixed, the number of jet streams decreases.

Effects

Hurricane protection

The subtropical jet stream rounding the base of the mid-oceanic upper trough is thought to be one of the causes most of the Hawaiian Islands have been resistant to the long list of Hawaii hurricanes that have approached. For example, when Hurricane Flossie (2007) approached and dissipated just before reaching landfall, the U.S. National Oceanic and Atmospheric Administration (NOAA) cited vertical wind shear as evidenced in the photo.

Uses
On Earth, the northern polar jet stream is the most important one for aviation and weather forecasting, as it is much stronger and at a much lower altitude than the subtropical jet streams and also covers many countries in the Northern Hemisphere, while the southern polar jet stream mostly circles Antarctica and sometimes the southern tip of South America. Thus, the term jet stream in these contexts usually implies the northern polar jet stream.

Aviation

The location of the jet stream is extremely important for aviation. It cut the trip time by over one-third, from 18 to 11.5 hours. Not only does it cut time off the flight, it also nets fuel savings for the airline industry. Within North America, the time needed to fly east across the continent can be decreased by about 30 minutes if an airplane can fly with the jet stream, or increased by more than that amount if it must fly west against it.

Associated with jet streams is a phenomenon known as clear-air turbulence (CAT), caused by vertical and horizontal wind shear caused by jet streams. The CAT is strongest on the cold air side of the jet, next to and just under the axis of the jet. Clear-air turbulence can cause aircraft to plunge and so present a passenger safety hazard that has caused fatal accidents, such as the death of one passenger on United Airlines Flight 826.

Possible future power generation

Scientists are investigating ways to harness the wind energy within the jet stream. According to one estimate of the potential wind energy in the jet stream, only one percent would be needed to meet the world's current energy needs. The required technology would reportedly take 10–20 years to develop.
There are two major but divergent scientific articles about jet stream power. Archer & Caldeira claim that the Earth's jet streams could generate a total power of 1700 terawatts (TW) and that the climatic impact of harnessing this amount would be negligible. However, Miller, Gans, & Kleidon claim that the jet streams could generate a total power of only 7.5 TW and that the climatic impact would be catastrophic.

Unpowered aerial attack
Near the end of World War II, from late 1944 until early 1945, the Japanese Fu-Go balloon bomb, a type of fire balloon, was designed as a cheap weapon intended to make use of the jet stream over the Pacific Ocean to reach the west coast of Canada and the United States. Relatively ineffective as weapons, they were used in one of the few attacks on North America during World War II, causing six deaths and a small amount of damage. However, the Japanese were world leaders in biological weapons research at this time. The Japanese Imperial Army's Noborito Institute cultivated anthrax and plague Yersinia pestis; furthermore, it produced enough cowpox viruses to infect the entire United States.
The deployment of these biological weapons on fire balloons was planned in 1944.
Emperor Hirohito did not permit deployment of biological weapons on the basis of a report by President Staff Officer Umezu on 25 October 1944. Consequently, biological warfare using Fu-Go balloons was not implemented.

Changes due to climate cycles

Effects of ENSO

El Niño-Southern Oscillation (ENSO) influences the average location of upper-level jet streams, and leads to cyclical variations in precipitation and temperature across North America, as well as affecting tropical cyclone development across the eastern Pacific and Atlantic basins. Combined with the Pacific Decadal Oscillation, ENSO can also impact cold season rainfall in Europe. Changes in ENSO also change the location of the jet stream over South America, which partially affects precipitation distribution over the continent.

El Niño
During El Niño events, increased precipitation is expected in California due to a more southerly, zonal, storm track. During the Niño portion of ENSO, increased precipitation falls along the Gulf coast and Southeast due to a stronger than normal, and more southerly, polar jet stream. Snowfall is greater than average across the southern Rockies and Sierra Nevada mountain range, and is well below normal across the Upper Midwest and Great Lakes states. The northern tier of the lower 48 exhibits above normal temperatures during the fall and winter, while the Gulf coast experiences below normal temperatures during the winter season. The subtropical jet stream across the deep tropics of the Northern Hemisphere is enhanced due to increased convection in the equatorial Pacific, which decreases tropical cyclogenesis within the Atlantic tropics below what is normal, and increases tropical cyclone activity across the eastern Pacific. In the Southern Hemisphere, the subtropical jet stream is displaced equatorward, or north, of its normal position, which diverts frontal systems and thunderstorm complexes from reaching central portions of the continent.

La Niña
Across North America during La Niña, increased precipitation is diverted into the Pacific Northwest due to a more northerly storm track and jet stream. The storm track shifts far enough northward to bring wetter than normal conditions (in the form of increased snowfall) to the Midwestern states, as well as hot and dry summers. Snowfall is above normal across the Pacific Northwest and western Great Lakes. Across the North Atlantic, the jet stream is stronger than normal, which directs stronger systems with increased precipitation towards Europe.

Dust Bowl
Evidence suggests the jet stream was at least partly responsible for the widespread drought conditions during the 1930s Dust Bowl in the Midwest United States. Normally, the jet stream flows east over the Gulf of Mexico and turns northward pulling up moisture and dumping rain onto the Great Plains. During the Dust Bowl, the jet stream weakened and changed course traveling farther south than normal. This starved the Great Plains and other areas of the Midwest of rainfall, causing extraordinary drought conditions.

Longer-term climatic changes

Since the early 2000s, climate models have consistently identified that global warming will gradually push jet streams poleward. Climate scientists have hypothesized that the jet stream will also gradually weaken as a result of global warming. Trends such as Arctic sea ice decline, reduced snow cover, evapotranspiration patterns, and other weather anomalies have caused the Arctic to heat up faster than other parts of the globe, in what is known as the Arctic amplification. In 2021-2022, it was found that since 1979, the warming within the Arctic Circle has been nearly four times faster than the global average, and some hotspots in the Barents Sea area warmed up to seven times faster than the global average. While the Arctic remains one of the coldest places on Earth today, the temperature gradient between it and the warmer parts of the globe will continue to diminish with every decade of global warming as the result of this amplification. If this gradient has a strong influence on the jet stream, then it will eventually become weaker and more variable in its course, which would allow more cold air from the polar vortex to leak mid-latitudes and slow the progression of Rossby Waves, leading to more persistent and more extreme weather.

The hypothesis above is closely associated with Jennifer Francis, who had first proposed it in a 2012 paper co-authored by Stephen J. Vavrus. While some paleoclimate reconstructions have suggested that the polar vortex becomes more variable and causes more unstable weather during periods of warming back in 1997, this was contradicted by climate modelling, with PMIP2 simulations finding in 2010 that the Arctic oscillation was much weaker and more negative during the Last Glacial Maximum, and suggesting that warmer periods have stronger positive phase AO, and thus less frequent leaks of the polar vortex air. However, a 2012 review in the Journal of the Atmospheric Sciences noted that "there [has been] a significant change in the vortex mean state over the twenty-first century, resulting in a weaker, more disturbed vortex.", which contradicted the modelling results but fit the Francis-Vavrus hypothesis. Additionally, a 2013 study noted that the then-current CMIP5 tended to strongly underestimate winter blocking trends, and other 2012 research had suggested a connection between declining Arctic sea ice and heavy snowfall during midlatitude winters.

In 2013, further research from Francis connected reductions in the Arctic sea ice to extreme summer weather in the northern mid-latitudes, while other research from that year identified potential linkages between Arctic sea ice trends and more extreme rainfall in the European summer, At the time, it was also suggested that this connection between Arctic amplification and jet stream patterns was involved in the formation of Hurricane Sandy  and played a role in the Early 2014 North American cold wave In 2015, Francis' next study concluded that highly amplified jet-stream patterns are occurring more frequently in the past two decades. Hence, continued heat-trapping emissions favour increased formation of extreme events caused by prolonged weather conditions.

Studies published in 2017 and 2018 identified stalling patterns of Rossby waves in the northern hemisphere jet stream as the culprit behind other almost stationary extreme weather events, such as the 2018 European heatwave, the 2003 European heat wave, 2010 Russian heat wave or the 2010 Pakistan floods, and suggested that these patterns were all connected to Arctic amplification. Further work from Francis and Vavrus that year suggested that amplified Arctic warming is observed as stronger in lower atmospheric areas because the expanding process of warmer air increases pressure levels which decreases poleward geopotential height gradients. As these gradients are the reason that cause west to east winds through the thermal wind relationship, declining speeds are usually found south of the areas with geopotential increases. In 2017, Francis explained her findings to the Scientific American: "A lot more water vapor is being transported northward by big swings in the jet stream. That's important because water vapor is a greenhouse gas just like carbon dioxide and methane. It traps heat in the atmosphere. That vapor also condenses as droplets we know as clouds, which themselves trap more heat. The vapor is a big part of the amplification story—a big reason the Arctic is warming faster than anywhere else."

In a 2017 study conducted by climatologist Dr. Judah Cohen and several of his research associates, Cohen wrote that "[the] shift in polar vortex states can account for most of the recent winter cooling trends over Eurasian midlatitudes". A 2018 paper from Vavrus and others linked Arctic amplification to more persistent hot-dry extremes during the midlatitude summers, as well as the midlatitude winter continental cooling. Another 2017 paper estimated that when the Arctic experiences anomalous warming, primary production in the North America goes down by between 1% and 4% on average, with some states suffering up to 20% losses. A 2021 study found that a stratospheric polar vortex disruption is linked with extreme cold winter weather across parts of Asia and North America, including the February 2021 North American cold wave. Another 2021 study identified a connection between the Arctic sea ice loss and the increased size of wildfires in the Western United States.

However, because the specific observations are considered short-term observations, there is considerable uncertainty in the conclusions. Climatology observations require several decades to definitively distinguish various forms of natural variability from climate trends. This point was stressed by reviews in 2013 and in 2017. A study in 2014 concluded that Arctic amplification significantly decreased cold-season temperature variability over the Northern Hemisphere in recent decades. Cold Arctic air intrudes into the warmer lower latitudes more rapidly today during autumn and winter, a trend projected to continue in the future except during summer, thus calling into question whether winters will bring more cold extremes. A 2019 analysis of a data set collected from 35 182 weather stations worldwide, including 9116 whose records go beyond 50 years, found a sharp decrease in northern midlatitude cold waves since the 1980s.

Moreover, a range of long-term observational data collected during 2010s and published in 2020s now suggests that the intensification of Arctic amplification since the early 2010s was not linked to significant changes on midlatitude atmospheric patterns. State-of-the-art modelling research of PAMIP (Polar Amplification Model Intercomparison Project) improved upon the 2010 findings of PMIP2 - it did find that sea ice decline would weaken the jet stream and increase the probability of atmospheric blocking, but the connection was very minor, and typically insignificant next to interannual variability. In 2022, a follow-up study found that while the PAMIP average had likely underestimated the weakening caused by sea ice decline by 1.2 to 3 times, even the corrected connection still amounts to only 10% of the jet stream's natural variability.

Additionally, a 2021 study found that while jet streams had indeed slowly moved polewards since 1960 as was predicted by models, they did not weaken, in spite of a small increase in waviness. A 2022 re-analysis of the aircraft observational data collected over 2002–2020 suggested that the North Atlantic jet stream had actually strengthened. Finally, a 2021 study was able to reconstruct jet stream patterns over the past 1,250 years based on Greenland ice cores, and found that all of the recently observed changes remain within range of natural variability: the earliest likely time of divergence is in 2060, under the Representative Concentration Pathway 8.5 which implies continually accelerating greenhouse gas emissions.

Other upper-level jets

Polar night jet
The polar-night jet stream forms mainly during the winter months when the nights are much longer, hence polar nights, in their respective hemispheres at around 60° latitude. The polar night jet moves at a greater height (about ) than it does during the summer. During these dark months the air high over the poles becomes much colder than the air over the Equator. The polar vortex is circled by the polar night jet. The warmer air can only move along the edge of the polar vortex, but not enter it. Within the vortex, the cold polar air becomes increasingly cold with neither warmer air from lower latitudes nor energy from the Sun entering during the polar night.

Low-level jets
There are wind maxima at lower levels of the atmosphere that are also referred to as jets.

Barrier jet
A barrier jet in the low levels forms just upstream of mountain chains, with the mountains forcing the jet to be oriented parallel to the mountains. The mountain barrier increases the strength of the low level wind by 45 percent. In the North American Great Plains a southerly low-level jet helps fuel overnight thunderstorm activity during the warm season, normally in the form of mesoscale convective systems which form during the overnight hours. A similar phenomenon develops across Australia, which pulls moisture poleward from the Coral Sea towards cut-off lows which form mainly across southwestern portions of the continent.

Coastal jet
Coastal low-level jets are related to a sharp contrast between high temperatures over land and lower temperatures over the sea and play an important role in coastal weather, giving rise to strong coast parallel winds. Most coastal jets are associated with the oceanic high-pressure systems and thermal low over land. These jets are mainly located along cold eastern boundary marine currents, in upwelling regions offshore California, Peru-Chile, Benguela, Portugal, Canary and West Australia, and offshore Yemen—Oman.

Valley exit jet
A valley exit jet is a strong, down-valley, elevated air current that emerges above the intersection of the valley and its adjacent plain. Surface winds below the jet tend to be substantially weaker, even when they are strong enough to sway vegetation.

Valley exit jets are likely to be found in valley regions that exhibit diurnal mountain wind systems, such as those of the dry mountain ranges of the US. Deep valleys that terminate abruptly at a plain are more impacted by these factors than are those that gradually become shallower as downvalley distance increases.

Africa

The mid-level African easterly jet occurs during the Northern Hemisphere summer between 10°N and 20°N above West Africa, and the nocturnal poleward low-level jet occurs in the Great Plains of east and South Africa. The low-level easterly African jet stream is considered to play a crucial role in the southwest monsoon of Africa, and helps form the tropical waves which move across the tropical Atlantic and eastern Pacific oceans during the warm season. The formation of the thermal low over northern Africa leads to a low-level westerly jet stream from June into October.

See also
Atmospheric river
Block (meteorology)
Polar vortex
Surface weather analysis
Sting jet
Tornado
Tropical Easterly Jet
Wind shear
Weather

References

External links

Current map of winds at the 250 hPa level
Tim Woolings, Jet Stream - A Journey Through our Changing Climate, 2020, Oxford University Press, ISBN 978-0-19-882851-8

Atmospheric dynamics
Wind
Articles containing video clips